Ao Hui (born 20 April 1997) is a Chinese weightlifter.

She participated at the 2018 World Weightlifting Championships, winning a gold medal.

Major results

References

External links

1997 births
Living people
Chinese female weightlifters
World Weightlifting Championships medalists
21st-century Chinese women